Diaporthe phaseolorum var. phaseolorum is a plant pathogen infecting soybean, sweet potato and peanut.

See also 
 List of soybean diseases
 List of sweet potato diseases
 List of peanut diseases

References

External links 
 Index Fungorum
 USDA ARS Fungal Database

Fungal plant pathogens and diseases
Soybean diseases
Root vegetable diseases
phaseolorum var. phaseolorum